The House of Valois-Anjou was a noble French family and cadet branch of the House of Valois. Members of the house served as monarchs of Naples, as well as several other territories.

History
The house was founded in the 1350s, when King John II of France, of the Valois line of Capetians, came to power. His paternal grandmother, Countess Margaret of Anjou and Maine, had been a princess of the Capetian House of Anjou or Elder Angevin Dynasty. She was the eldest daughter of King Charles II of Naples and gave Anjou to the second son of king John II of France, Louis.

Within a couple of decades, Queen Joan I of Naples, also of the senior Angevin line, realized that she would remain childless. Although there were extant heirs of the senior branch, for example, the Anjou-Durazzo cadet line, she decided to adopt Louis as her final heir.

Thus, in addition to the struggle of the Angevins with Aragon in Southern Italy, the two Angevin lines, senior and junior, now began to contest with each other for the possession of the Kingdom of Naples.

The Anjou-Durazzo line was initially successful in securing control of Naples, but the Valois House of Anjou managed to secure Provence and continued to contest the throne, with Louis II actually in control of the city of Naples from 1389 to 1399.

The extinction of the line of the House of Anjou-Durazzo in 1435 temporarily secured Naples for the Valois House of Anjou, but they were driven from Naples by Alfonso V of Aragon in 1442.

René, the last duke of this, third, Angevin line, died in 1480, and Anjou reverted to the French crown.  With the death of his nephew Count Charles IV of Maine in 1481, all Angevin possessions, including Provence, reverted to the crown.

The Angevin pretensions to Naples were continued intermittently by the House of Lorraine, which descended from René's eldest daughter Yolande. Notably, the Valois-Habsburg War of 1551 to 1559 saw Duke Francis of Guise, a member of a cadet branch of the House of Lorraine, lead an unsuccessful French expedition against Naples.

See also
 Angevin Empire
 House of Plantagenet or first Angevin dynasty
 Capetian House of Anjou or second Angevin dynasty
 Armorial of Plantagenet